Bruno Albert Forsterer (July 14, 1869 – June 13, 1957) was a U.S. Marine Sergeant who received the Medal of Honor for actions during the Second Samoan Civil War for "distinguished conduct in the presence of the enemy at Samoa, Philippine Islands, April 1, 1899." His Medal of Honor was awarded by President Theodore Roosevelt, by General Order No 55, dated July 19, 1901.

Forsterer joined the Marine Corps from Boston in November 1896, and was honorably discharged 13 years later.

Medal of Honor citation

Rank and organization: Sergeant, U.S. Marine Corps. Born: July 14, 1869, Koenigsberg, Germany. Accredited to: Massachusetts. G.O. No.: 55, July 19, 1901.

Citation:

For distinguished conduct in the presence of the enemy at Samoa, Philippine Islands, 1 April 1899.

After the war
William E. Dargie appointed Bruno Forsterer general manager of the Oakland Tribune. Upon Dargie's death on February 10, 1911, Forsterer succeeded Dargie as the publisher of the paper (1911–1915). Forsterer also served as the executor for the Dargie's will. Forsterer would serve new Tribune owner, (former U.S. Congressman) Joseph R. Knowland as Business Manager of the Oakland Tribune, (1915–1957).

In 1936, Joseph Knowland, Bruno Forsterer and Joseph Blum founded the Franklin Investment Company (later, the Franklin Credit Union). His son, Harold B. Forsterer (1900–1974) served as Secretary-Treasurer of the Oakland Tribune (1957–1965).

Bruno Forsterer is buried in Arlington National Cemetery. His grave is located in section 53, Lot 2757.

See also

 List of Medal of Honor recipients

Notes

References

External links
  Includes brief summary of action resulting in the Medal of Honor award.

American military personnel of the Philippine–American War
Burials at Arlington National Cemetery
Foreign-born Medal of Honor recipients
German emigrants to the United States
United States Marine Corps Medal of Honor recipients
Military personnel from Königsberg
Oakland Tribune people
People from the Province of Prussia
United States Marines
1869 births
1957 deaths
Samoan Civil War recipients of the Medal of Honor